The RagWing RW2 Special I is a family of biplane, single engine homebuilt aircraft designed by Roger Mann and sold as plans by RagWing Aircraft Designs for amateur construction.

Design and development
The RW2 was designed as a single seat lightweight Pitts Special S-1 replica for the US experimental homebuilt aircraft category. The RW26 was added later and is a replica of the Pitts S-2 two-seater.

As with many RagWing designs the RW2 and 26 feature airframes constructed entirely from wood and covered with aircraft fabric. The airframe uses a Pratt truss. The RW2 has an optional 4130 steel tube fuselage. The landing gear is of conventional configuration with bungee suspension. The wings are detachable for storage or ground transport.

In the early 2000s kits were available for construction, but today the aircraft are available only as plans. The designer estimates it will take 400 hours to complete either aircraft and claims that the RW2 can be built for US$5000, including a new engine.

Variants
RW2 Special
Single seat biplane
RW26 Special II
Two seats in tandem biplane

Specifications (RW2 Special)

See also

References

External links

Homebuilt aircraft